Monroe Township , founded June 9, 1825, is one of the fourteen townships of Clermont County, Ohio, United States. As of the 20201 census the population was 8,213. The township is the Birthplace of Ulysses S Grant.

Geography
Located in the southwestern part of the county along the Ohio River, it borders the following townships:
Batavia Township - north
Tate Township - east
Washington Township - south
Ohio Township - west
Pierce Township - northwest
Campbell County, Kentucky lies across the Ohio River to the southwest.

No municipalities are located in Monroe Township, although the unincorporated community of Point Pleasant lies in the township's south along the Ohio River. Other unincorporated areas include Nicholsville, Ohio and Laurel, Ohio.

Name and history
It is one of 22 Monroe Townships statewide.

Government
The township is governed by a three-member board of trustees, who are elected in November of odd-numbered years to a four-year term beginning on the following January 1. Two are elected in the year after the presidential election and one is elected in the year before it. There is also an elected township fiscal officer, who serves a four-year term beginning on April 1 of the year after the election, which is held in November of the year before the presidential election. Vacancies in the fiscal officership or on the board of trustees are filled by the remaining trustees. Monroe Township also employees a Township Administrator for Overall daily activities.

Parks
The township maintains two parks: Fair Oak Park in Amelia and Monroe Community Park in Bethel. There is also a rest stop across from the Grant Birthplace and the Bachelier Park sports complex operated by Amelia Knothole Baseball.

Notable places
 Mt. Zion Cemetery/Lafayette School
 Grant Memorial Bridge
 Grant Birthplace
 Henry Clark Corbin/Colclazer Run

Services and safety
A full service maintenance and service department repair and service township roads, maintain and repair all buildings the township owns and provide support services for some cemeteries located in the township. A contract with the Clermont County Sheriff's office helps to provide an enhanced law enforcement presence in the township. Fire/EMS services are provided by Monroe Township from two stations.

School districts
Monroe Township is covered by two School districts. New Richmond Exempted Village School District and West Clermont Local School District.

Notable people
Ulysses S. Grant (April 27, 1822 – July 23, 1885) Commanding General of the United States Army during the American Civil War and 18th President of the United States
Henry Clark Corbin (September 15, 1842 – September 8, 1909) Adjutant General of the U.S. Army from 1898 to 1904
Eliza Archard Conner (1838 – 1912), journalist, lecturer, and feminist

References

External links

Township website
County website
Fire-EMS website

Townships in Clermont County, Ohio